Roberts Elementary School may refer to:

Arkansas
 Dr. Don R. Roberts Elementary School - Little Rock, Arkansas - Little Rock School District

Florida
 Roberts Elementary School - Tallahassee, Florida - Leon County Schools

Georgia
 C. A. Roberts Elementary School - Dallas, Georgia - Paulding County School District
 Roberts Elementary School - Suwanee, Georgia - Gwinnett County Public Schools

Pennsylvania
 Roberts Elementary School - Wayne, in Upper Merion Township, Pennsylvania - Upper Merion Area School District
Tennessee
 A.H. Roberts Elementary School - Livingston, Tennessee
 Roberts Elementary School - Hardy, Tennessee
 Roberts Elementary School - Hilham, Tennessee
 Roberts Elementary School - Twinton, Tennessee  
Texas
 Oran M. Roberts Elementary School - Dallas, Texas - Dallas Independent School District
 Roberts Elementary School - El Paso, Texas - El Paso Independent School District
 Oran M. Roberts Elementary School - Houston, Texas - Houston Independent School District
 Roy W. Roberts Elementary School - Lubbock, Texas - Lubbock Independent School District
 O. M. Roberts Elementary School - Lake Jackson, Texas - Brazosport Independent School District